Onna Babo is a 2002 Sri Lankan Sinhala children's film directed by Dinesh Priyasad and produced by Lalindra Wijewickrama for Lalindra Films. It stars Sangeetha Weeraratne and child actress Shanudrie Priyasad in lead roles along with Wimal Kumara de Costa and Ronnie Leach. Music composed by Somapala Rathnayake. It is the 989th Sri Lankan film in the Sinhala cinema. The film has influenced by the 1994 Hollywood film Baby's Day Out.

Plot

Cast
 Shanudrie Priyasad as Baby Shanudrie "Shanu" Senanayake
 Sangeetha Weeraratne as Shyama Senanayake
 Shan Ranjith as Shan Senanayake
 Wimal Kumara de Costa as Lengwa
 Ronnie Leitch as Mingwa
 Don Guy as Domingo
 Leticia Peiris
 Janaki Wijeratne as Ann
 Chathura Senadeera as Malan
 Tyrone Michael as Billy
 Teddy Vidyalankara

References

2002 films
2000s Sinhala-language films